Daniele Bracciali and Potito Starace were the defending champions, but were eliminated in the quarterfinals.

Colin Fleming and Ross Hutchins won the tournament, defeating Michail Elgin and Alexandre Kudryavtsev 6–3, 6–7(5–7), [10–8] in the final.

Seeds

Draw

Draw

References
 Main Draw

2011 Doubles
St. Petersburg Open - Doubles
2011 in Russian tennis